The Canton of Vitry-en-Artois is a former canton situated in the department of the Pas-de-Calais and in the Nord-Pas-de-Calais region of northern France. It was disbanded following the French canton reorganisation which came into effect in March 2015. It had a total of 28,479 inhabitants (2012).

Geography 
The canton was organised around Vitry-en-Artois in the arrondissement of Arras. The altitude varies from 25m (Brebières) to 113m (Monchy-le-Preux) for an average altitude of 57m.

The canton comprised 28 communes:

Bellonne
Biache-Saint-Vaast
Boiry-Notre-Dame
Brebières
Cagnicourt
Corbehem
Dury
Étaing
Éterpigny
Fresnes-lès-Montauban
Gouy-sous-Bellonne
Hamblain-les-Prés
Haucourt
Hendecourt-lès-Cagnicourt
Monchy-le-Preux
Noyelles-sous-Bellonne
Pelves
Plouvain
Récourt
Rémy
Riencourt-lès-Cagnicourt
Rœux
Sailly-en-Ostrevent
Saudemont
Tortequesne
Villers-lès-Cagnicourt
Vis-en-Artois
Vitry-en-Artois

Population

See also
Cantons of Pas-de-Calais 
Communes of Pas-de-Calais 
Arrondissements of the Pas-de-Calais department

References

Vitry-en-Artois
2015 disestablishments in France
States and territories disestablished in 2015